Prince Grenville Singh (born in Chennai, Tamil Nadu, India) is the current Bishop of the Dioceses of Eastern Michigan and Western Michigan. He was the eighth Bishop of the Episcopal Diocese of Rochester.

Biography 
Singh studied at the Madras Christian College in Tambaram and the Union Biblical Seminary in Pune, India. In 1990 he was ordained priest of the Church of South India. Before going to the United States he served congregations in India. Between 1997 and 2000 he was associate rector at St Peter's Church in Morristown, New Jersey. In 2000 he became rector of St Alban's Church in Oakland, New Jersey. He was elected Bishop of Rochester in February 2008 and consecrated on 31 May 2008 by Presiding Bishop Katharine Jefferts Schori. In February 2022, Bishop Singh resigned from his post as the Bishop of Rochester, to become the Provisional Bishop for the Dioceses of Eastern Michigan and Western Michigan, being consecrated by Presiding Bishop Michael Curry.

See also
 List of Episcopal bishops of the United States
 Historical list of the Episcopal bishops of the United States

References

External links

Living people
Christian clergy from Chennai
Madras Christian College alumni
Year of birth missing (living people)
Episcopal bishops of Rochester